Bedlenki  is a village in the administrative district of Gmina Drzycim, within Świecie County, Kuyavian-Pomeranian Voivodeship, in north-central Poland.

The village has a population of 30.

References

Bedlenki